Myhaylo Mykolayovych Knysh (born November 22, 1983 in Zhytomyr) is a Ukrainian sprinter, who specialized in the 400 metres. Knysh made his official debut for the 2004 Summer Olympics in Athens, where he placed sixth for the national sprint team in the preliminary heats of men's 4 × 400 m relay, with a time of 3:04.01.

At the 2008 Summer Olympics in Beijing, Knysh competed for the men's 400 metres this time, as an individual athlete. He ran in the seventh heat against seven other athletes, including defending Olympic champion Jeremy Wariner of the United States. He finished the race in sixth place by one quarter of a second (0.25) behind Russia's Maksim Dyldin, with a time of 46.28 seconds. Knysh, however, failed to advance into the semi-finals, as he placed thirty-sixth overall and was ranked below three mandatory slots for the next round. He also tied his overall position in the heats with Dominican Republic's Arismendy Peguero.

References

External links

NBC 2008 Olympics profile

Ukrainian male sprinters
Living people
Olympic athletes of Ukraine
Athletes (track and field) at the 2004 Summer Olympics
Athletes (track and field) at the 2008 Summer Olympics
Sportspeople from Zhytomyr
1983 births